KPRP may refer to:

 Kampuchean People's Revolutionary Party (KPRP), also known as the Cambodian People's Party
 Communist Party of Poland (1918-1925), 
 KPRP-LP, a low-power radio station (99.1 FM) licensed to serve Portland, Oregon, United States; see List of radio stations in Oregon
 KPRP (AM), a defunct radio station in Honolulu
 Keratinocyte Proline Rich Protein (KPRP)